J.J. Connolly is the author of two crime novels, Layer Cake, and its sequel, Viva La Madness. He also wrote the screenplay of the film based on his novel.

Novels

His first novel, Layer Cake, was first published in 2000 by Duckworth Press.  The book takes place in nineties London and is narrated by an unnamed, 29-year-old drug dealer ("If you knew my name, you'd be as clever as me") who plans on leaving the crime game behind at the age of thirty to live life as "a gentleman of leisure." His retirement plan, however, is made complicated by a large shipment of stolen ecstasy, the German neo-Nazis who want it back and revenge on anyone they hold responsible for the theft, the unpredictable and often outrageous personalities of his friends, and his boss, kingpin Jimmy Price, who has charged him with the task of recovering the missing daughter of a wealthy socialite.

His second novel, Viva La Madness was published in 2011, and resumes after the first, in which only two characters remain: the unnamed narrator and his partner in crime, Mister Mortimer, AKA Morty. It begins in the Caribbean with Morty attempting to recruit the reluctant narrator back to London and the crime business as a super-salesman and closer for a UK syndicate.

Adaptations

In 2004, Layer Cake was adapted into a feature film directed by Matthew Vaughn. Connolly wrote the screenplay for the film, and wanted to portray the character Lucky in the film.

Connolly is adapting his second novel, Viva La Madness for film, where actor Jason Statham was expected to star, rather than Daniel Craig.

References

External links
 Duckworth Publishers - author page with photo
 Duckworth Publishers about Viva La Madness

English crime fiction writers
Living people
Year of birth missing (living people)